The City Centre Aquatic Complex is an indoor aquatic centre featuring an Olympic size swimming pool in the Town Centre area of Coquitlam, British Columbia. The building was designed by Vic Davies Architect Ltd., built at a cost of $8.2 million, and opened in March 1994. The interior is orange with rope railings around the wave pool. The pools use ozone for secondary water purification.

The 8-lane, 50-meter Olympic length swimming pool features:
 Adjustable depth flooring (up to 2 metres)
 Two moveable bulkheads
 1m and 3m diving boards
 Rope swing
 Mini Zip line
 Cargo Net
 WIBIT inflatable obstacle course
 Running Mat

The adjacent free form play area features:
 Wave pool
 Lazy river
 Boat with spray gun
 Large rain drop
 Water spraying bamboo decor and dumping bucket
 Island that serves as a mini jumping platform
 54 metre waterslide (that protrudes outside the building)
 Moderate temperature bubble pool
 Higher temperature whirlpool
 Steam room
 Dry sauna

In addition, the  fitness centre is equipped with cardiovascular conditioning equipment, strength-training equipment, and free weights. The facility also includes a poolside café, viewing terrace, multi-purpose rooms, and a physiotherapy clinic.

The temperature in the pool area is kept at approximately 29.5 °C (85 °F), while the fitness centre is air conditioned to a cooler temperature.

External links
 City of Coquitlam swimming pools
 Satellite view of City Centre Aquatic Complex on Google Maps

Sports venues in Coquitlam
Swimming venues in British Columbia